Short Style is the EP by the American alternative rock band Lazlo Bane released on Almo Sounds label.

Overview 
Short Style features 5 tracks, 4 originals and a cover of Men at Work's song "Overkill", originally written by Colin Hay, who makes a guest appearance on the track. All of the songs from the EP appeared on the band's debut album 11 Transistor, which was released half a year later. However, the song "Prada Wallet" was not featured in the track listing and appeared as a hidden track.

The length of the song "Sleep" in incorrectly listed on the EP as 3:48, but it is actually the same version that was released on 11 Transistor.

Track listing

Personnel
Lazlo Bane – primary artist
Lyle Workman – guitar and bass on "Buttercup"
Josh Freese – drums on "Buttercup" and "Prada Wallet"
Colin Hay – guitar and vocals on "Overkill"
David Dale – guitar on "Overkill"
Tony Phillips – mixing

Additional personnel
Jill Berliner – legal
Keryn Kaplan – management
Paul McGuinness – management
Paul Kremen – artist & repertoire
Robin Sloane – creative director
Mary Lynne Barbis – art direction, design
Patrick Raske – art direction, design
Lauren Lambert – photography

References

1996 debut EPs
Lazlo Bane EPs
Almo Sounds albums
Albums produced by Chad Fischer